World Bowl XIII, officially known as Yello Strom World Bowl XIII, was NFL Europe's 2005 championship game.  It was played at the LTU arena in Düsseldorf, Germany on June 11, 2005.  In this match-up, the 6–4 Amsterdam Admirals got back to the World Bowl after losing in World Bowl III and spending nearly a decade being on the outside.  Now, they had a chance to dig deep and win big.  Their opponent for the match-up was the Berlin Thunder, who were coming off their best year (9–1 and a victory in World Bowl XII) and made it back to the World Bowl with a 7–3 record, hoping to defend their title.  35,134 fans were in attendance for the fight.  After many years of suffering, the Admirals won their first World Bowl title by stripping the defending champion Thunder of their title, by a final score of 27–21.  Taking home MVP honors was Admirals QB Kurt Kittner, who went 15 of 28 for 239 yards with 2 touchdowns and no interceptions.

Background 
The Admirals won the first meeting 31–27 in Amsterdam, while the Thunder took the second meeting 27–16 in Berlin.

Game summary 
The Admirals drew first blood on their opening possession as Admirals QB Kurt Kittner lead his team on a 9-play, 68-yard drive and capped it off with a 22-yard TD pass to WR Ruvell Martin.  It would turn out to be the only score of the first quarter.  

In the second quarter, the Admirals would quickly add to their lead.  They used their first full possession of the period on just one play, but it would be swift and painful, as Amsterdam took advantage of a fumble recovery to take control at Berlin's 12-yard line.  Afterward, Kittner threw a 12-yard TD pass to TE Mike Gomez.  On their next possession, the Admirals continued to pour it on, as his Admirals stopped a 4th down conversion from the Thunder and took over with good field position (Berlin's 27-yard line).  Despite the good position, the Thunder defense finally stiffened and the Admirals had to settle for a 32-yard field goal by kicker Chris Snyder.  The Berlin Thunder would finally be able to get on the board near the end of the half, as Thunder QB Dave Ragone led his team on a 4-play, 51-yard drive and capped it off with a 10-yard pass to WR Aaron Boone.  Despite the impressive resurgence, the first half belonged to Amsterdam as they lead 17–7 at halftime.  

In the third quarter, the Admirals continued to show how much they want Berlin's crown by striking on their opening drive.  Kittner led his team on a 4-play, 80-yard drive that ended with RB Jonathan Smith running 18 well-earned yards for a TD.  

Trailing 24–7 going into the fourth quarter, the Thunder needed a lot of points in a hurry, if they wanted to defend their title.  Continuing a drive that began in the final seconds of the third quarter, Ragone led his team on a 5-play, 80-yard drive that concluded with a 10-yard TD pass to RB Little John Flowers.  However, the Admirals continued to put the game further out of reach, as they responded with a 28-yard field goal by Snyder.  Ragone and his Thunder would respond with a 10-play, 78-yard drive and get a TD with Ragone himself running in on a 10-yard QB sneak.  With another long drive, the Berlin Thunder set themselves up near the redzone again, where the Admirals forced the Berlin Thunder to 4th down with 5 seconds to spare. That final play ended with Norman LeJeune writing history for the Amsterdam Admirals when he batted away a Dave Ragone pass intended for WR Redd. The Admirals pulled off an upset by taking down the defending champions and win their first World Bowl title.

Scoring summary 
Amsterdam – TD Martin 22 yd pass from Kittner 4:52 1st
Amsterdam – TD Gomez 12 yd pass from Kittner 3:03 2nd
Amsterdam – FG Snyder 32 yd 8:00 2nd
Berlin – TD Boone 10 yd pass from Ragone 14:27 2nd
Amsterdam – TD Smith 18 yd run 5:14 3rd
Berlin – TD Flowers 10 yd pass from Ragone 1:19 4th
Amsterdam – FG Snyder 28 yd 5:51 4th
Berlin – TD Redd 10 yd pass from Ragone 10:05 4th

References

External links
 NYTimes article

World Bowl
2005 NFL Europe season
2005 in American football
2005 in German sport
June 2005 sports events in Europe